Sri Lanka is a tropical island situated close to the southern tip of India. The invertebrate fauna is as large as it is common to other regions of the world. There are about 2 million species of arthropods found in the world, and counting. 

The following list is about Cockroaches recorded in Sri Lanka.

Cockroach
Phylum: Arthropoda
Class: Insecta
Order: Blattodea

Cockroaches are insects of the order Blattodea, which also includes termites. About 30 cockroach species out of 4,600 are associated with human habitats. About four species are well known as pests. Cockroaches are somewhat generalized insects without special adaptations like the sucking mouthparts of Hemiptera; they have chewing mouthparts and are likely among the most primitive of living neopteran insects. They are common and hardy insects, and can tolerate a wide range of environments from Arctic cold to  tropical heat. Tropical cockroaches are often much bigger than temperate species, and, contrary to popular opinion, extinct cockroach relatives and 'roachoids' such as the Carboniferous Archimylacris and the Permian Apthoroblattina were not as large as the biggest modern species.

Cockroaches are members of the order Blattodea, which includes the termites, a group of insects once thought to be separate from cockroaches. Currently, there are 4,600 species described and over 460 genera worldwide.

The following list provide the cockroaches currently identified in Sri Lanka. An exclusive update and taxonomic research on cockroaches in Sri Lanka has been not under taken so far by the scientific community. With records and few earlier studies, they have found that 66 species of cockroaches can be found from Sri Lanka, belongs to 6 families and 31 genera.

Endemic species are denoted as E.

Family: Blaberidae - Giant cockroaches
Ancaudellia lobipennis 
Corydidarum humbertiana
Diploptera punctata
Indoapterolampra rugosiuscula
Morphna lucida
Morphna plana
Panesthia plagiata
Phlebonotus pallens
Pseudoglomeris glomeris 
Pycnoscelus indicus 
Pycnoscelus nigra 
Pycnoscelus surinamensis
Rhabdoblatta subsparsa
Rhabdoblatta terranea
Salganea passaloides
Salganea passaloides passaloides
Stictolampra punctata
Stilpnoblatta opaca
Thorax porcellana

Family: Blattidae - Household cockroaches
Dorylaea archershee
Dorylaea zeylanica
Neostylopyga parallela
Neostylopyga rhombifolia
Periplaneta americana
Periplaneta australasiae
Periplaneta ceylonica
Pelmatosilpha princisi
Pelmatosilpha sinhalensis
Thyrsocera spectabilis

Family: Corydiidae - Sand cockroaches
Euthyrrhapha pacifica
Holocompsa debilis
Therea petiveriana

Family: Ectobiidae - Wood cockroaches
Allacta diluta
Allacta figurata
Anaplecta avicharapura
Anaplecta erythronota
Anaplecta galathea
Anaplecta gyrinoides
Anaplecta karakoush
Anaplecta kekilla
Anaplecta marshallae
Anaplecta ratnadvipa
Anaplecta srilanka
Anaplecta thwaitesi
Anaplecta zeylanica
Anaplectella maculata
Anaplectella pilatus
Anaplectella thwaitesi
Anaplectella warreni
Anaplectoidea modesta
Balta notulata
Balta reticulata
Blattella asahinai
Blattella biligata
Blattella bisignata
Blattella germanica
Blattella humbertiana
Blattella lituricollis
Blattella parvula
Blattella vaga
Delosia ornata
Delosia sabaragamua
Liosilpha pumicata
Margattea ceylanica
Supella longipalpa

Family: Nocticolidae
Cardacus willeyi
Nocticola rohini

References

.Sri
 
Cockroaches
Sri Lanka